South Kalimantan People's Representative Council is the unicameral legislature of the Indonesian province of South Kalimantan. The council is composed of 55 members chosen every 5 years from the general election. Currently, Golkar Party is currently party with the most seats in this province. In addition, the council has four commissions.

Structure 
The council has one speaker and three deputy speakers, and also four commissions.

 Commission I of Government and Financial sector
 Commission II of Economic sector
 Commission III of People's Welfare sector
 Commission IV of Physical Structure & Infrastructure sector

Fraction 
Currently there are 8 fractions within the council.

References 

Provincial assemblies of Indonesia
South Kalimantan